Muhammad Nur Ridho Bin Ahmad Jafri (born 18 August 1994) is a Singaporean former professional footballer.

Career

As a child, Ridho's parents took away his football shoes so he would focus on school, but his grandmother gave him money to buy new ones. 

After playing for Singapore's under-21 national team, Ridho played professionally for Young Lions and Hougang United in the S.League before joining Yishun Sentek Mariners in the second division.

References

External links
 Nur Ridho at Soccerway

Singaporean footballers
Living people
1994 births
Association football midfielders